Janice Cooke is an American television director and producer.

She began her professional career as an associate producer on the series Fantasy Island in 1980. Followed by a number of other television producing credits in Blue Thunder, Our Family Honor, Werewolf, Hard Time on Planet Earth, Moon Over Miami, The Marshal and Any Day Now. She made her episodic directorial debut with Any Day Now.

Cooke-Leonard's directorial credits include Dawson's Creek, The Division, Summerland, Charmed, Close to Home, Privileged, The Ex List, The Cleaner, 90210, One Tree Hill, Cold Case, Gossip Girl, Bluff City Law, Station 19, How to Get Away with Murder, 4400 and Swagger. She has also participated in the production of the web series Hollywood Is Like High School with Money.

References

External links 

African-American television directors
American television directors
American television producers
American women television producers
American women television directors
Living people
Place of birth missing (living people)
Year of birth missing (living people)
21st-century African-American people
21st-century African-American women